The Changos, also known as Camanchacos or Camanchangos,  are an indigenous people or group of peoples who inhabited a long stretch of the Pacific coast from southern Peru to north-central Chile, including the coast of the Atacama desert.
Although much of the customs and culture of the Chango people have disappeared and in many cases they have been considered extinct, in Chile they are legally recognized as an original indigenous people since 2020, and about 4,725 people self-declare that they belong to this ethnic group.

History

Definition and context of the Changos
The culture originated in the 8,000-year-old Chinchorro tradition. Due to a combination of conquest and integration into other cultures and ethnicities, the Chango culture is now considered extinct. However, in Chile they are legally recognized as an original indigenous people since 2020, and about 4,725 people self-declare that they belong to this ethnic group.

The Changos were not a distinct tribe or ethnic group; rather, the term is used to refer to many disparate communities of indigenous people living along the northern Chilean and southern Peruvian coast in the Pre-Columbian era. The term "chango" was first documented in the 17th century by Spanish conquistadors who perceived little in the way of cultural difference between the local native communities. Therefore, "chango" describes a loose grouping of maritime peoples who shared a similar way of life rather than a common history or ethnicity. In general, Chango culture is considered more primitive than neighbouring cultures such as the Atacameños.
Chango culture is part of the Chinchorro tradition. The Chinchorro were hunter-fisher-gatherers with a particular reliance on the sea, who lived along the Atacama coast from at least the 8th century BC. They are of special interest to modern anthropologists due to their practice of mummifying the dead.

Changos around Paposo appear by 1870 to have spoken a dialect of Mapudungun, the language of the Mapuche people of south-central Chile. In the coast of Antofagasta Region there are toponyms near the coast claimed to be Mapuche including Taltal and Quebrada Mamilla.

Some older works starting with Benjamín Vicuña Mackenna (1869) claim the Changos people extended once as far south as Valparaíso (33° S), but clear evidence for this is lacking.

Chango economy

Chango communities were organised into either nomadic or sedentary groups based on nuclear family units. Each group was independent of the others, providing food and other resources for itself.
The Changos were experts at exploiting the resources of the sea. Each group specialised in a particular type of fish, including tuna, conger eels, mullet, dart fish, mackerel and octopus. Rafts used for fishing developed from primitive reed constructions to craft made from three wooden planks, and later to seal skins fastened to wooden frames. Fish were caught using nets, hooks and harpoons.
The capture of seals was of crucial importance to the Chango way of life, with every part of the animal having its uses. The meat, fat and bones were used for food and tools, the skins were used to make rafts and the intestines to make fishing equipment.
As well as seal skins, the Changos used vicuña wool, feathers, bird skins, shells and the bones and teeth of sea creatures as materials to make practical and decorative items such as clothing, blankets, tools, cutlery and jewellery. They also made and painted ceramic utensils.
Despite their geographical isolation, the Changos traded with inland tribes, exchanging shellfish, dried fish, animal hide, guano, fat and shells for wool, fruit, maize and coca.
Chango cave paintings include images of men hunting and fishing and sea creatures such as seals, turtles and whales.

See also
 Indigenous peoples in Chile
 Atacama desert
 Chinchorro culture

External links

References

Indigenous peoples of the Southern Cone
Pre-Columbian cultures
Indigenous peoples of the Americas
Indigenous peoples of the Andes
Indigenous peoples in Chile
Atacama Desert
Antofagasta Region
Indigenous peoples in Peru